Oleksandr Driha, (Ukrainian: Олександр Дріга), is a Paralympian athlete from Ukraine competing mainly in category T37 middle-distance events.

Oleksandr competed in the 2004 Summer Paralympics where he won gold in both the 400m and 800m, silver in the 1500m and was a part of the bronze medal Ukrainian relay teams in the 4 × 100 m and 4 × 400 m.

References

Paralympic athletes of Ukraine
Athletes (track and field) at the 2004 Summer Paralympics
Paralympic gold medalists for Ukraine
Paralympic silver medalists for Ukraine
Paralympic bronze medalists for Ukraine
Living people
Medalists at the 2004 Summer Paralympics
Year of birth missing (living people)
Paralympic medalists in athletics (track and field)
Ukrainian male sprinters
Ukrainian male middle-distance runners